Hugh Anthony Victor Arthur, OBE (born Bridgetown, Barbados 1945) was High Commissioner of Barbados in London from 2008 until 2013.

Arthur was educated  at Trent University and the University of Surrey. Arthur spent many years with the Barbados Tourist Board. He was also a lecturer in Tourism at the University of the West Indies.

References 

1945 births
People from Bridgetown
Living people
Officers of the Order of the British Empire
High Commissioners of Barbados to the United Kingdom
Alumni of the University of Surrey
University of the West Indies academics
Trent University alumni